Gross-Rosen was a network of Nazi concentration camps built and operated by Nazi Germany during World War II. The main camp was located in the German village of Gross-Rosen, now the modern-day Rogoźnica in Lower Silesian Voivodeship, Poland; directly on the rail-line between the towns of Jawor (Jauer) and Strzegom (Striegau). Its prisoners were mostly Jews, Poles and Soviet citizens.

At its peak activity in 1944, the Gross-Rosen complex had up to 100 subcamps located in eastern Germany and in German-occupied Czechoslovakia and Poland. The population of all Gross-Rosen camps at that time accounted for 11% of the total number of inmates incarcerated in the Nazi concentration camp system.

The camp

KZ Gross-Rosen was set up in the summer of 1940 as a satellite camp of the Sachsenhausen concentration camp from Oranienburg. Initially, the slave labour was carried out in a huge stone quarry owned by the SS-Deutsche Erd- und Steinwerke GmbH (SS German Earth and Stone Works). In the fall of 1940 the use of labour in Upper Silesia was taken over by the new Organization Schmelt formed on the orders of Heinrich Himmler. It was named after its leader SS-Oberführer Albrecht Schmelt. The company was put in charge of employment from the camps with Jews intended to work for food only.

The Gross-Rosen location close to occupied Poland was of considerable advantage. Prisoners were put to work in the construction of a system of subcamps for expelees from the annexed territories. Gross Rosen became an independent camp on 1 May 1941. As the complex grew, the majority of inmates were put to work in the new Nazi enterprises attached to these subcamps.

In October 1941 the SS transferred about 3,000 Soviet POWs to Gross-Rosen for execution by shooting. Gross-Rosen was known for its brutal treatment of the so-called Nacht und Nebel prisoners vanishing without a trace from targeted communities. Most died in the granite quarry. The brutal treatment of the political and Jewish prisoners was not only in the hands of guards and German criminal prisoners brought in by the SS, but to a lesser extent also fuelled by the German administration of the stone quarry responsible for starvation rations and denial of medical help. In 1942, for political prisoners, the average survival time-span was less than two months.

Due to a change of policy in August 1942, prisoners were likely to survive longer because they were needed as slave workers in German war industries. Among the companies that benefited from the slave labour of the concentration camp inmates were German electronics manufacturers such as Blaupunkt, Siemens, as well as Krupp, IG Farben, and Daimler-Benz, among others. Some prisoners who were not able to work but not yet dying were sent to the Dachau concentration camp in so-called invalid transports.

The largest population of inmates, however, were Jews, initially from the Dachau and Sachsenhausen camps, and later from Buchenwald. During the camp's existence, the Jewish inmate population came mainly from Poland and Hungary; others were from Belgium, France, Netherlands, Greece, Yugoslavia, Slovakia, and Italy.

Following the unsuccessful Polish Warsaw Uprising of 1944, the Germans deported 3,000 Poles from the Dulag 121 camp in Pruszków, where they were initially imprisoned, to Gross-Rosen. Those Poles were mainly people of 20 to 40 years of age.

Subcamps
At its peak activity in 1944, the Gross-Rosen complex had up to 100 subcamps, located in eastern Germany and German-occupied Czechoslovakia and Poland. In its final stage, the population of the Gross-Rosen camps accounted for 11% of the total inmates in Nazi concentration camps at that time. A total of 125,000 inmates of various nationalities passed through the complex during its existence, of whom an estimated 40,000 died on site, on death marches and in evacuation transports. The camp was liberated on 14 February 1945 by the Red Army. A total of over 500 female camp guards were trained and served in the Gross-Rosen complex. Female SS staffed the women's subcamps of Brünnlitz, Graeben, Gruenberg, Gruschwitz Neusalz, Hundsfeld, Kratzau II, Oberaltstadt, Reichenbach, and Schlesiersee Schanzenbau.

The Gabersdorf labour camp had been part of a network of forced labor camps for Jewish prisoners that had operated under Organization Schmelt since 1941. The spinning mill where the female Jewish prisoners worked had been "Aryanized" in 1939 by a Vienna-based company called Vereinigte Textilwerke K. H. Barthel & Co. The prisoners also worked in factories operated by the companies Aloys Haase and J. A. Kluge und Etrich. By 18 March 1944 Gabersdorf had become a subcamp of Gross-Rosen.

One subcamp of Gross-Rosen was the Brünnlitz labor camp, situated in the Czechoslovakian town of Brněnec, where Jews rescued by Oskar Schindler were interned.

The Brieg subcamp, located near the village of Pampitz, had originally been the location of a Jewish forced labor camp until August 1944, when the Jewish prisoners were replaced by the first transport of prisoners from the Gross-Rosen main camp. The camp was mostly staffed by soldiers from the Luftwaffe and a few SS members. Most of the prisoners were Polish, with smaller numbers of Russian and Czech prisoners. Most of the Poles had been evacuated from the Pawiak prison in Warsaw; others had been arrested within the territory controlled by the Reich or had been transported from Kraków and Radom.

Brieg's camp kitchen was run by Czech prisoners. The three daily meals included 1 pint of mehlzupa (a soup made from water and meal), 150 grams of bread, 1 quart of soup made with rutabaga, beets, cabbage, kale or sometimes nettles, 1 pint of black "coffee" and a spoonful of molasses.  Sometimes "hard workers" called zulaga would be rewarded with a piece of blood sausage or raw horsemeat sausage, jam and margarine. Prisoners also received 1 cup of Knorr soup per week.

Camp commandants
During the Gross-Rosen initial period of operation as a formal subcamp of Sachsenhausen, the following two SS Lagerführer officers served as the camp commandants, the SS-Untersturmführer Anton Thumann, and SS-Untersturmführer Georg Güßregen. From May 1941 until liberation, the following officials served as commandants of a fully independent concentration camp at Gross-Rosen:
 SS-Obersturmbannführer Arthur Rödl, May 1941 – September 1942
 SS-Hauptsturmführer Wilhelm Gideon, September 1942 – October 1943
 SS-Sturmbannführer Johannes Hassebroek, October 1943 until evacuation

War crimes trial
On 12 August 1948 the trial of three Gross Rosen camp officials, Johannes Hassebroek, Helmut Eschner and Eduard Drazdauskas, began before a Soviet Military Court. On 7 October 1948 all were found guilty of war crimes. Eschner and Drazdauskas were sentenced to life imprisonment and Hassebroek was sentenced to death, but this was later commuted also to life imprisonment.

List of Gross-Rosen camps with location

The most far-reaching expansion of the Gross-Rosen system of labour camps took place in 1944 due to accelerated demand for support behind the advancing front. The character and purpose of new camps shifted toward defense infrastructure. In some cities, as in Wrocław (Breslau) camps were established in every other district. It is estimated that their total number reached 100 at that point according to list of their official destinations. The biggest sub-camps included AL Fünfteichen in Jelcz-Laskowice, four camps in Wrocław, Dyhernfurth in Brzeg Dolny, Landeshut in Kamienna Góra, and the entire Project Riese along the Owl Mountains.

Notable inmates
 Boris Braun, Croatian university professor
 Simon Wiesenthal, Nazi hunter. He provides the following information about the camp in his 1967 book The Murderers Among Us:
 "... healthy looking prisoners were selected to break in new shoes for soldiers on daily twenty mile marches. Few prisoners survived this ordeal for more than two weeks."
 Władysław Ślebodziński, mathematician who taught prisoners
 Shlomo Zev Zweigenhaft, Rosh Hashochtim of Poland and Chief Rabbi of Hannover and Lower Saxony
 Franciszek Duszeńko, sculptor, maker of the Treblinka Monument
 Adam Dulęba, Polish Army photographer
 Heda Margolius Kovály, Czech writer and translator
 Lucian Ludwig Kozminski, convicted in the United States of swindling Holocaust survivors of their restitution money and alleged collaborator
 Adolphe Rabinovitch, Special Operations Executive officer.
 Henri Story, Belgian business man, politician and resistance member
 Paul Löbe, former president of the German Reichstag
 Gertruda Sekaninová-Čakrtová, Czechoslovak politician (imprisoned at Kurzbach subcamp)

See also 
 List of Nazi-German concentration camps
 List of subcamps of Gross Rosen
 The Holocaust in Poland
 Nazi crimes against the Polish nation
 Project Riese
 Die Glocke (conspiracy theory)

Notes

References 
 
 Willem Lodewijk Harthoorn (nl), an inmate from the end of April to mid-August 1942: Verboden te sterven (in Dutch: Forbidden to Die), Pegasus, Amsterdam. 
 
 Druhasvetovavalka.cz collection of photographs from the KZ Gross-Rosen World War II field trip.

External links 

 Concentration camps of Nazi Germany: illustrated history on YouTube
 The Death March through Schlesiersee to Volary, at Yad Vashem website
 Collection of testimonies concerning Gross-Rosen camp in 'Chronicles of Terror' database

 
1940 establishments in Germany
1945 disestablishments in Poland
Museums in Lower Silesian Voivodeship
Registered museums in Poland
Reich Security Main Office
World War II museums in Poland
World War II sites in Poland